Thursby is a village in the Allerdale borough of Cumbria, England. It is near to the city of Carlisle in North West England. Thursby was historically part of Cumberland.

History 
Thursby  lies on an old Roman road, 6 miles south of Carlisle. Thursby takes its old name 'Thor's by' from Thor, the Thunder God of the Saxons, whose temple was reputedly nearby at Kirksteads. The village is predominantly centred on the church, a Victorian building built in 1846 and funded by the Brisco family of Crofton Hall. A bit of heritage comes to Thursby with the church reportedly have been built by King David I of Scotland. Thursby has always been known as a commuter village for travellers to pass through. The Romans once passed through Thursby on their way to Carlisle. However today the village is predominately a bedroom community for the city nearby – the village is closely linked. Thursby continues to thrive and grow with active community groups and regular events occurring at the parish halls as well as sports and sporting facilities (plat area at the Jubilee Field next to Thursby Primary School). The Ship Inn provides an open fire and great pub food.

Sir Thomas Bouch ( 1822 –1880) was a British railway engineer, born and educated in Thursby. His father was a retired sea captain who kept the Ship Inn in Thursby.  Designer of the first Tay Bridge. Plaque on wall at the inn.

Governance 
Thursby lies within the Workington constituency. Prior to Brexit in 2020, the village was part of the North West England constituency in the European Parliament.

Education 
Thursby has one primary school, "Thursby Primary School" located on School Road, post code – Cumbria CA5 6PN. The school acts a very traditional primary school on the basis that it accepts children of ages 4–11 and any ability. Governors of Thursby Primary School have described it as a "happy, vibrant village school, which is situated 6 miles west of Carlisle".

Landmarks 
While Thursby still largely remains a commuters' village there are still many attractions. There are many interesting buildings in or around the village centre (a useful map can be found at the noticeboard near the green). Traditional clay – walled buildings are a feature of Thursby, named examples include Greenwood Cottage on the green and Rosedene Cottage opposite the church on Matty Lonning. Examples of the larger Georgian farms still exist at Holly Lodge and West House in the village centre. The more dated 17th century farmhouse at Evening Hill has elements of clay structures with outward buildings and a cart entrance found when entering south out of the village towards Curthwaite. A little further on is the Tudor – styled Evening Hill House built in 1833, with twisted candlestick chimneystacks.

Church 
St Andrews Church at the west end of Church Lane, built in 1846 is Thursby's main church and is responsible for many organised activities from the parish council. Funded by the Brisco family, on the site of the previous church, it has been said to have been built by David I, King of Scotland. The present church has a number of monuments dating back to its time from bells located in the tower, marble monuments to ancient font encrypted in the walls.

Transport 
There are two major roads that run through Thursby, one being the A595 and the other being the A596. These two roads link Thursby to Carlisle. Curthwaite railway station was situated nearby, closing in 1950.

Since being located in a very rural area the bus service is the only form of transport in Thursby there is limited bus services, the most prominent bus service would be the 38 run by Stagecoach. The 38 bus completes a run from Eden Street, Silloth to Carlisle Bus Station. The nearest railway stations to Thursby are Dalston (2.49 miles) and Wigton (4.59 miles).

Demographics 
Thursby has a population of 1,185, increasing to 1,216 measured at the 2011 census.

Over the last 150 years, Thursby's population has clearly aged. However, mortality decline in the late 19th century was mainly due to the reduction of very high infant mortality rates. During the 20th century, declining fertility and improved life expectancy in later life significantly changed age structures. The presence or absence of large numbers of infants dying before their first birthday had little effect on overall age structures.

Social statistics 

This shows the social status, based on 1831 occupations. We can see that as expected, there are a large proportion of servant and manual labourers (as shown in green). At 1831, the employers would have largely been on agricultural land. However, for a rural village in the 19th century, Thursby does have a large number of middle and upper social classes compared to others. The 1831 census provides information, down to parish level but only shows occupations of males over 20.

Weather

See also

Listed buildings in Thursby

References

External links 

 Cumbria County History Trust: Thursby (nb: provisional research only – see Talk page)

Villages in Cumbria
Place names
Civil parishes in Cumbria
Allerdale